The Leaders We Deserved, also known as The Leaders We Deserved (and a Few We Didn't), is a non-fiction book written by historian Alvin S. Felzenberg. Published by Basic Books in 2008, the work chronicles United States history with a specific focus on the relative performances of different national leaders, the author contrasting his categorized approach with what he views as the sloppier record of past rankings. Presidents receive distinct analysis based on multiple factors including economic wisdom, ideal-based foresight, personal character, and more in the book.

In the book, the author concludes that Abraham Lincoln was America's greatest president. James Buchanan, Lincoln's immediate predecessor, occupies the dead last slot. Andrew Johnson, Lincoln's immediate successor, ranks next to last.

Background and contents

Felzenberg's broad motivation for the book came from his interest in American presidents and his intent "not to fix their reputations in concrete, but to provoke discussion."

Looking back at past discussions over the various American presidents and historical rankings later made of them, the author argues that the academic process has fallen victim to certain negative trends, and he stresses that the analysis must not only attempt to evaluate individuals based on broad assessments of their performance but on a composite approach looking at different leadership categories. These, in Felzenberg's opinion, should include looking at diverse factors from the performance of the U.S. economy due to presidential actions to leaders' behaviors in advancing the causes of individual liberty to intellectual competence in the administrations managed by the presidents and more.

In his study of American history, the author finds fault with conventional wisdom in certain areas and agrees with it in others. In particular, Felzenberg's assessment of Abraham Lincoln as America's greatest president is followed closely by that of George Washington as its second greatest while both Ronald Reagan and Theodore Roosevelt tie for third place. Dwight D. Eisenhower falls into fifth place.

In contrast to Lincoln's placement, James Buchanan, Lincoln's immediate predecessor, occupies the dead last slot. Andrew Johnson, Lincoln's immediate successor, ranks next to last. Felzenberg chooses not to evaluate historic leaders James A. Garfield and William H. Harrison as well as then currently serving president George W. Bush.

In terms of the general conclusions of his analysis, Felzenberg later stated,

Later comments by the author
In an interview with the website Freakonomics.com after the book came out, Felzenberg stated that he believed that physical endurance should be another category by which presidents should be evaluated. He remarked, "The endless 24/7 cycle of appearances, interviews, fundraising, and all the rest that goes along with running for president that the two top contenders [running in 2008] have endured reminds us that the job of president almost demands superhuman qualities."

See also

2008 in literature
Historical rankings of presidents of the United States
Personal character
Competence (human resources)
Foresight (psychology)
Moral idealism
Personal endurance
Recarving Rushmore

References

External links
Washington Journal interview with Felzenberg on The Leaders We Deserved - July 4, 2008

2008 non-fiction books
Basic Books books
English-language books
Books about politics of the United States
History books about the United States